Sin City Sinners is a group of musicians who perform self-penned originals and rock and roll covers at key venues throughout Las Vegas, Nevada. The band is composed of a tight-knit group of core members: Brent Muscat (ex-Faster Pussycat), guitar; Todd Kerns (Age of Electric, Static in Stereo, Slash), lead vocals and guitar; and Rob Cournoyer (Raging Slab), drums. In addition, Sin City Sinners' performances regularly feature appearances by many notable musicians, comedians, actors, and other entertainers. The group started around 2007, and was spun off from an earlier "Sin City All-Stars" band that featured Brent Muscat and Louie Merlino, amongst others.

In 2009, The Sin City Sinners decided to finally put some of their originals and favorites into their debut CD. The CD "Exile on Fremont Street" was produced by frontman Todd Kerns and released in early 2010. The album was met with rave reviews. The hard work of the Sin City Sinners also garnished them the title of "Best In Vegas – Editor's Pick" by the Las Vegas Review-Journal.

In mid-2010, Todd Kerns was offered the "opportunity of a lifetime" for any guitar player; to go on tour with Slash. Todd joined Slash on his solo album promotion tours and continues to front the Sin City Sinners when in Las Vegas. While Todd was on tour, the Sinners continued on with help from Louie Merlino (Beggars & Thieves), Jimmy Crespo (Aerosmith) and Scott Griffin (LA Guns).

On December 17, 2010, The Sin City Sinners released the all-acoustic album titled Broken Record. On November 25, 2011, the band released the holiday CD A Sinners Christmas, produced by Brent Muscat & Tom Parham and executive produced by Jason Green. A Sinners Christmas included guest appearances by George Lynch, Ron Keel, Slim Jim Phantom (The Stray Cats), Jizzy Pearl (RATT, Love/Hate), Pete Loran (Trixter), Louie Merlino (Beggars & Thieves), Frank Dimino (Angel) and Sammy Serious (The Zeros).

In early 2012, long-time bassist Michael "Doc" Ellis left the band, and was replaced by Zach Throne (CMFT, Corey Taylor) solo project. In 2013, Michael Ellis returned to play bass and sing, with Zach Throne taking the front man spot while Todd Kerns was on tour with Slash.

In July 2014, Zach Throne left the band and with Todd Kerns out on tour again with Slash, they recruited Joshua Alan to take the frontman position.
In September 2014, Scott Griffin (formerly of L.A. Guns) was added to the group as bass player.

On February 19, 2016, Joshua announced his departure from the Sin City Sinners in order to work full-time with Ratt.

Awards and honors 
Two years in a row (2009 and 2010) the Sin City Sinners won 'Best of Vegas' in the Las Vegas Review Journal reader's poll,

In 2010, their music video "Going to Vegas" received the 32nd annual Telly Award.

In 2014, the band won the Best of Las Vegas award for best local band, as voted by people across the Vegas Valley. Likewise, that same year, Las Vegas mayor Carolyn G. Goodman proclaimed August 27, 2014 (the band's 7th anniversary) to be Sin City Sinners day, in response to the band's charitable efforts over the years which have generated nearly a million dollars to go towards numerous worthy causes. 

In 2015, the band won Las Vegas Weeklys "Best of Vegas" Readers Choice Award.

Guests 

Sebastian Bach
Vinny Appice
Kip Winger
Tony Kanal
A. Jay Popoff
Jeremy Popoff
Kevin Baldes
Nathan Walker
Stephen Bradley
Kevin Federline
Jeff Watson
Kathy Valentine
Joey Belladonna
Dizzy Reed
Carrot Top
Eddie Ojeda
Annabella Lwin
Chuck Billy
Vinnie Paul
Slim Jim Phantom
Chris Holmes
Clint Lowery
Riki Rachtman
Rob Affuso
Doug Aldrich
Jeff Pilson
Dave Ellefson
Gilby Clarke
Blas Elias
George Lynch
DJ Ashba
Tiffany
Bruce Kulick
Phil Lewis
East Bay Ray
Jeff LaBar
Frank Hannon
Oz Fox
Mark Kendall
Evan Seinfeld
Jerry Dixon
Phil Varone
Johnny Kelly
Simon Wright
Carey Hart
Stacey Q
Jeremy London
Jimmy Crespo
Sami Yaffa
Cheetah Chrome
Cherie Currie
Ian Mitchell
Jizzy Pearl
Ron Keel
Donnie Vie
Terry Ilous
Michael Olivieri
Paul Shortino
Steve Riley
Greg D'Angelo
Randy Piper
Frankie Banali
Steve Summers
Louie Merlino & Ron Mancuso
Brent Fitz
Lez Warner
Mickey Finn
Kyle Kyle
Stacey Blades
Chas West
Frank Dimino
Eric Dover
Joey Vera
Paul Crook
Chuck Wright
Chris Frazier
Tod Howarth
Jeff Scott Soto
Alex Mitchell
Brent Woods
Brooke St. James
Pete Reveen
Tommy Paris
Dario Lorina
Sammy Serious
Frankie Muriel
Derrick Pontier
Steve Unger
Duncan Faure
Brian Wheat
Dave Rude
Russ Parrish
Tyler Connolly
Jason Hook
Whitfield Crane
Yasuki Tamiguchi

Discography 

 Exile on Fremont St. (2010): The band's first full-length album. Features a mixture of new songs, songs Todd Kerns did originally as a solo artist/Static In Stereo, and one other cover song ("Ah! Leah!", originally by Donnie Iris.)
 Broken Record (2010): An acoustic EP of 6 songs. 4 songs are acoustic versions of ones from Exile, 2 are newly recorded for this disc.
 A Sinner's Christmas (2011): The band's collection of covers of holiday classics. Includes many special guests, and a spoken word intro from porn legend Ron Jeremy. Features guest stars, including Jizzy Pearl and Ron Keel.
 Divebar Days Revisited (2013): A collection of assorted cover songs the band played during their earlier years together. Guests include Chris Holmes and Phil Lewis.
 A Sinner's Christmas 2 (2013): The second Christmas CD from the band. Guests include Tiffany and Oz Fox.
 Let It Burn (2016): A full-length CD with original songs written by previous band members, and the current band members at that time.

Venues 
Previous venues played by the band have included the Divebar, Santa Fe Station, Boulder Station, and Sunset Station. Other common venues include the Rio Hotel and Casino, Favorites Bar and Grill (now the Dive Bar), the Zebra Lounge, and the Fremont Street Experience. The band has also played at Girls Girls Girls, a new strip club owned by Mötley Crüe's Vince Neil. Other venues have included the Hard Rock Hotel and Casino and Count's Vamp'd, owned by Danny "The Count" Koker, from the History Channel's Counting Cars.

In earlier shows, the band would typically walk onto stage with the recorded version of The Good, the Bad and the Ugly (theme) by Ennio Morricone playing over the speakers.

References 

Other sources
http://www.lvrj.com/blogs/vegasvoice/Sin_City_Sinners_Pushes_Back_Against_Killers_In_Poll_Fans_React.html

External links 
 Official website
 
 
RoadRunner Records Review 

Interviews
 
 
 
 

American hard rock musical groups
Rock music supergroups
Culture of the Las Vegas Valley